Joseph Küffner (Kueffner) (31 March 1776 in Würzburg – 9 September 1856 in Würzburg) was a German musician and composer who, among other achievements, contributed significantly to the guitar repertory, including chamber music.

Life
He was a violinist with the Würzburg court orchestra, and was later, when Würzburg became part of Bavaria (1802), assigned to take charge of military music. At this point he became bandmaster with a Bavarian Army regiment.

Music
A quintet of Küffner's for clarinet and strings was once attributed to Carl Maria von Weber, and is still recorded in collections of Weber's music. He composed seven symphonies and a large number of works for various chamber music combinations. His output also contains a substantial quantity of music for classical guitar (some of it being available in modern editions).

Compositions
Symphonies
First Symphony op. 75 (pub. Schott, 1818)
Second Symphony op. 76 (Schott)
Third Symphony op. 83 (pub. André, ca 1820)
Fourth Symphony op. 141 (Schott)
Fifth Symphony op. 142 (pub. by 1824) (Schott)
Sixth Symphony op. 150 (Schott)
Seventh Symphony op. 164 (pub. 1826) (Schott)
Concertante
Polonaise for trumpet and orchestra, op. 126
Potpourri, Concerto [No. 1] in D for viola and orchestra op. 57 (1816)
Concerto [No. 2] in A for viola and orchestra, op. 139 (1823)
Chamber music
Serenade for flute (or violin), violin (or viola) and guitar (or piano) op. 4
Serenade für Flöte oder Violine, Viola und Klavier =Serenade for flute or violin, viola and piano : op. 10
Serenade for clarinet, viola and guitar op. 21
Introduction, theme and variations for clarinet quintet (attributed to Weber as opus 32)
Clarinet quintet op. 33
Trios for three flutes op. 34
Quintet for five winds plus bass op. 40 no. 3
Three String Quartets op. 41
Sonata for guitar and piano op. 42 in C
Serenade for flute (or violin) and guitar in C op. 44
Serenade for clarinet, viola and guitar op. 45
String Quartet in F major op. 52 (by 1820)
Serenade for flute, viola and guitar op. 60
Horn Quintet op. 66
Duets for clarinet and oboe op. 80
25 Sonatines for guitar op. 80
Three Duos for Two Clarinets op. 81
Twelve duos for two guitars op. 87
Serenade in D for violin (or flute) and guitar, op. 97
Three duets for clarinets op. 105
Notturno op. 110 for violin, flute, viola and guitar (or lute) op. 110
Harmoniemusik op. 138
Quintetto, guitare & quatuor à cordes, op. 156
Serenade for flute and guitar in C op. 158
Etudes for two guitars op. 168
Musique Militaire, sinfonie et danses (opp. 169–70)
String Quartet op. 178 (1823-4)
Introduction, theme and variations op. 190
Potpourri on Il Barbiere di Siviglia op. 198
24 Instructive Duets for oboes op. 199
24 Instructive Duets for clarinets op. 200
24 Instructive Duets for bassoons op. 212
XXIme Potpourri pour piano et flute ou violon sur des motifs de l'opéra "Guillaume Tell", op. 225 (pub. 1852)
Divertissement for horn or viola or cello and piano op. 231
31me Potpourri, pour piano et flûte ou violon op. 257
40me Potpourri pour piano et flûte ou violon: motifs favoris de l'opéra Le postillon de Lonjumeau d'Adolphe Adam op. 275
Pastorale pour guitarre

References

External links

Sheetmusic
Rischel & Birket-Smith's Collection of guitar music 1 Det Kongelige Bibliotek, Denmark
Boije Collection The Music Library of Sweden
MDZ (Munich Digitisation Centre)
University of Rochester

1776 births
1856 deaths
Composers for the classical guitar
German classical composers
German male classical composers
Musicians from Würzburg
String quartet composers
German military musicians